Stillbirth is the debut album by Oneiroid Psychosis, released in 1995. Included were a few tracks from their previous effort, known simply as Psychosis. The album was re-released in 2003 by their record label, COP International. The album artwork is by Paul Nitsche.

Track listing
 "Succubi"  – 5:47 words by Leif
 "Prurience"  – 4:32 words by Leif
 "Fleshmachine"  – 4:36 words by Leif
 "Bloodlust"  – 4:08 words by Leif
 "Menarche"  – 5:31 words by Lars
 "Hypnagogic Existence"  – 8:06 words by Lars
 "Psychopathia Sexualis"  – 6:13 words by Lars
 "Mind's I"  – 3:59 words by Leif
 "Motionless"  – 4:26 words by Lars
 "Broken Eyes"  – 7:24
 "These Shattered Falling"  – 5:56

Sample credits
 "Succubi"
Moans from Tracy Lords and Christy Canyon, Lust in the Fast Lane
 "Fleshmachine"
"I guess I'll forget psychiatry; stick with surgery."
Dr. McCoy, Star Trek
 "Menarche"
Heavy breathing from 2010
 "Hypnagogic Existence"
"I want you to realize that the dream was real."
from a PBS mini-series on dreams
 "Psychopathia Sexualis"
"eye-eye" from Gothic
"Is it possible to communicate with the deceased? Is it possible to communicate with the dead?"
Edited phrase from In Search Of: Ghost Photographs

References

1995 debut albums
Oneiroid Psychosis albums